Lita Nurlita (born 1 November 1983) is an Indonesian former badminton player affiliated with SGS PLN Bandung club. She won the women's doubles title at the 2003 Southeast Asian Games, and was part of the Indonesian women's team that won the 2007 Southeast Asian Games. She also won three bronze medals at the Asian Championships in 2003, 2005, and 2007.

Career 
Nurlita competed in badminton at the 2004 Summer Olympics in women's doubles with partner Jo Novita. They had a bye in the first round and were defeated by Yang Wei and Zhang Jiewen of China in the round of 16.

Personal life 
When Nurlita was young, she joined the SGS Bandung badminton club. Her parents' names are Kristiana (father) and Lilis Nurhayati (mother), and she has seven siblings. Her hobbies are listening to music and fishing. Generally people called her Lita or Ci Ita.

Achievements

Asian Championships 
Women's doubles

Mixed doubles

Southeast Asian Games 
Women's doubles

World Junior Championships 
Mixed doubles

Asian Junior Championships 
Girls' doubles

BWF Grand Prix (2 titles, 2 runners-up) 
The BWF Grand Prix had two levels, the Grand Prix and Grand Prix Gold. It was a series of badminton tournaments sanctioned by the Badminton World Federation (BWF) and played between 2007 and 2017. The World Badminton Grand Prix was sanctioned by the International Badminton Federation from 1983 to 2006.

Women's doubles

Mixed doubles

  BWF Grand Prix Gold tournament
  BWF & IBF Grand Prix tournament

Asian Satellite (1 title) 
Mixed doubles

Performance timeline

National team 
 Junior level

 Senior level

Individual competitions 
 Junior level

 Senior level

References

External links 
 

1983 births
Living people
Sportspeople from Bandung
Indonesian female badminton players
Badminton players at the 2004 Summer Olympics
Olympic badminton players of Indonesia
Badminton players at the 2006 Asian Games
Asian Games competitors for Indonesia
Competitors at the 2003 Southeast Asian Games
Competitors at the 2005 Southeast Asian Games
Competitors at the 2007 Southeast Asian Games
Competitors at the 2009 Southeast Asian Games
Southeast Asian Games gold medalists for Indonesia
Southeast Asian Games silver medalists for Indonesia
Southeast Asian Games bronze medalists for Indonesia
Southeast Asian Games medalists in badminton
20th-century Indonesian women
21st-century Indonesian women